The Northwestern Band of the Shoshone Nation is a federally recognized tribe of Shoshone people, located in Box Elder County, Utah. They are also known as the Northwestern Band of Shoshoni Indians.

Current land holdings of the Band

The tribe owns a piece of land near the Utah-Idaho border, which is 189-acres large. It is located near Washakie, Utah.  According to Darren Parry, the Northwestern Band does not consider this land a reservation as they own the land and are self-sustaining, not relying on federal sponsorship.

Government
The tribe's headquarters is in Brigham City, Utah, but they also have a tribal office in Pocatello, Idaho. The tribe is governed by a democratically elected, seven-member tribal council. The current administration is as follows:

 Chairman: Dennis Alex
 Vice-Chairman, Website and Social Media Manager: Bradley Parry
 Secretary: Alicia Martinez
 Treasurer, EPA + Roads Pocatello Office Manager : Jason S. Walker
 Council Member, Fundraising: Darren Parry
 Council Member: Shane Warner
 Council Member, Economic Development: Jeffrey Parry

Shane Warner was formerly Treasurer.

The Northwestern Band of Shoshone ratified their constitution on August in 1987.

Economic development
In 2008, the Northwestern Band began construction on a 100-megawatt geothermal plant near Honeyville, Utah, near the Utah-Idaho Border.

Language
Traditionally, the Northwestern Band of Shoshone Tribe speaks the Northern Shoshoni dialect of the Shoshoni language, which is written in the Latin script.

Notable people with Northwestern Band of the Shoshone Nation ancestry 
Mae Timbimboo Parry, storyteller, activist

Notes

References
 Pritzker, Barry M. A Native American Encyclopedia: History, Culture, and Peoples. Oxford: Oxford University Press, 2000. .

External links
 Northwestern Band of the Shoshone Nation, official website

Western Shoshone
Native American tribes in Utah
American Indian reservations in Utah
Geography of Box Elder County, Utah
Federally recognized tribes in the United States